Mak Erot (1907? – 5 July 2008) was a lady from West Java, Indonesia. She was widely known for helping men to lengthen their penises using traditional herbs and traditional prayers.

Her age is disputed; various sources have described her as between 101 and 130 years old. Her story has been made into a number of plays and movies, such as XL (Extra Large: Between Me, You and Mak Erot) starring Francine Roosenda. She died in July 2008 in Caringin village, west Java.

References

2008 deaths
Male genital modification
Indonesian centenarians
Year of birth unknown
Year of birth uncertain
Women centenarians
1900s births